With regard to a mobile network operator (MNO, or operator), the term dumb pipe, or dumb network, refers to a simple network that, with a high enough bandwidth to transfer bytes between the customer's device and the Internet without the need to prioritize content, can afford to be completely neutral with regard to the services and applications the customer accesses. The use of the term "dumb" refers to the fact that the network operator does not affect the customer's accessibility of the Internet such as by either limiting the available services or applications to its own proprietary portal (like a walled garden) or offer additional capabilities and services beyond simple connectivity (like a smart pipe, the term with which it contrasts). A dumb pipe primarily provides simple bandwidth and network speeds greater than the maximum network loads expected thus avoiding the need to discriminate between data types.

Among the commonly understood operational models for a MNO are the dumb pipe, the smart pipe, and the walled garden.

Description

A dumb network is marked by using intelligent devices (i.e. PCs) at the periphery that make use of a network that does not interfere with or manage an application's operation / communication. The dumb network concept is the natural outcome of the end to end principle. The Internet was originally designed to operate as a dumb network.

In some circles the dumb network is regarded as a natural culmination of technological progress in network technology. With the justification that the dumb network uniquely satisfies the requirements of the end to end principle for application creation, supporters see the dumb network as uniquely qualified for this purpose, as – by design – it is not sensitive to the needs of applications. The dumb network model can, in some ways, allow for flexibility and ease of innovation in the development of applications that is not matched by other models.

Examples 
One widely regarded example of the operator "dumb pipe" scenario is Apple's iPhone. The iPhone enables its users to directly surf the Internet with its mobile Safari browser and connects to Apple's iTunes Store for purchasing ringtones and music instead of the operator's own portal. Operators such as AT&T Mobility cannot offer their traditional services (such as downloads of wallpapers, ringtones, games, applications, etc.) as Apple controls the total iPhone user experience. Operators must be content to provide only the network connectivity and bandwidth which the iPhone has tripled in some cities. In addition to losing valuable revenue opportunities with the customer, operators are rumored to pay Apple a percentage of the customer's monthly bill as well. While the iPhone is a good example of the dumb pipe, not everyone believes it will ultimately be bad for operators.

Another example of the operator dumb pipe / smart pipe dilemma is the upcoming deployment of WiMAX technology. Companies such as Sprint Nextel and Clearwire are looking into ways to deploy WiMAX with additional services to keep them from becoming dumb pipes.

Opinions

Criticism 

Critics of dumb network architecture posit two arguments in favor of "intelligent" networks. The first, that certain users and transmission needs of certain applications are more important than others and thus should be granted greater network priority or quality of service. An example is that of real time video applications that are more time sensitive than say, text applications. Thus video transmissions would receive network priority to prevent picture skips, while text transmissions could be delayed without significantly affecting its application performance. The second is that networks should be able to defend against attacks by malware and other bad actors.

Support 

Advocates of dumb networks  counter the first argument by pointing out that prioritizing network traffic is very expensive in monetary, technology, and network performance. Dumb networks advocates also consider the real purpose for prioritizing network traffic is to overcome insufficient bandwidth to handle traffic and not a network protocol issue.  The security argument is that malware is an end-to-end problem and thus should be dealt with at the endpoints, and that attempting to adapt the network to counterattacks is both cumbersome and inefficient.

See also 
 walled garden
 Smart pipe
 Series of tubes

References

External links 
 The Operators vs. the Media Brands
 The Pipe Is Only Dumb If You Make It That Way
 Juniper Research Report: Business Models for Mobile Content Players, Strategic Options & Scenarios 2007-2012 (Paywall)
 Study About MNOs Share of Mobile Content Market
 Rise of the Stupid Network, original release May 1997, by David S. Isenberg of AT&T Labs Research that explains several dumb network concepts.

Mobile technology
Net neutrality
Network architecture